Thomas Petrus A. Koenis (born 11 December 1989) is a Dutch retired basketball player. Standing at 2.10 m (6 ft 11 in), he played at the center position.

He started his career with the Den Helder Seals in 2007, before signing with West-Brabant Giants in 2009. After two seasons for the Giants, Koenis signed with Donar. In 2015, he signed with ZZ Leiden where he stayed for two seasons before returning to Donar. Koenis played 15 season of professional basketball, with nine of them being with Donar. After his career, Koenis' number 14 was retired by the club to honour him.

In international play, Koenis represented the Netherlands men's national basketball team in 41 games.

Early life
Koenis was born in Hoogkarspel and first played football as a keeper and was also interested in judo. He started playing basketball at age 13 with BV Enkhuizen.

Professional career
Koenis started his professional career with the Den Helder Seals in 2007. After two seasons Koenis left Den Helder for WCAA Giants from Bergen op Zoom, because the club from Den Helder was bankrupt. When the Giants decided to leave the Dutch Basketball League as well in 2011, Koenis signed a 3-year contract with the GasTerra Flames from Groningen.

In the 2015 offseason, Koenis signed a 2-year deal with ZZ Leiden.

On 9 June 2017, returned to Donar by signing a 3-year contract. On 10 January 2018, Koenis scored 25 points while shooting 9/9 from the field, accumulating an efficiency rating of 36 in a 109–69 win against Keravnos in the FIBA Europe Cup. This earned him the Top Performer honour for Round 2 of the FIBA Europe Cup second round. In the 2017–18 season, Koenis was named to the All-DBL Team for the first time.

On 25 June 2022, Koenis announced his retirement from professional basketball at age 32. On 6 December 2022, Donar retired Koenis' jersey number 14, while also naming a stand in the MartiniPlaza after him.

Awards and accomplishments

Club
Donar
2× Dutch Basketball League: 2013–14, 2017–18
4× NBB Cup: 2013–14, 2014–15, 2017–18, 2021–22
Dutch Supercup (2): 2014, 2018

Individual
2× MVP Under 23: 2008–09, 2011–12
3× DBL All-Star: 2015, 2016, 2017
2× DBL All-Defense Team: 2016–17, 2017–18

References

1989 births
Living people
B.S. Leiden players
Centers (basketball)
Den Helder Kings players
Donar (basketball club) players
Dutch Basketball League players
Dutch men's basketball players
People from Drechterland
Sportspeople from North Holland
West-Brabant Giants players